Gang Albanii is a  Polish hip-hop group formed in 2014 by Polish DJ Rozbójnik Alibaba and rapper Popek. Borixon, a rapper from Kielce, joined the group a few months later.

Etymology 
In Polish, Gang Albanii means "Gang of Albania". Popek lived in the United Kingdom, where he met Albakrallet, which influenced him to name his new band after him.

Career 
Gang Albanii has reached great commercial success in Poland. Their most popular song Dla prawdziwych dam (For the True Ladies) has over 50 million views on YouTube. They are recognized for their obscene lyrics, which usually are about drugs, hookers or bank robberies. Popek, the group's leader, can't officially appear on stageconcerts, as the Polish Police is searching for him. To circumvent this, he performs onscreen through Skype.

Gang Albanii released their first album Królowie życia (Kings of Life) in 2015. The album turned out to be a hit - it sold more than 90 thousand copies, awarding the group a triple platinum record from ZPAV.

Gang Albanii's second album, Ciężki Gnój (Heavy Dung) was scheduled to be released in 2016.

Discography 
 Albums

 Singles

References

Polish hip hop groups